Craspedia is a genus of robber flies in the family Asilidae.

References

Further reading

External links

 
 

Asilidae genera